The 2022 Samford Bulldogs football team represented Samford University as a member of the Southern Conference (SoCon) during the 2022 NCAA Division I FCS football season. The Bulldogs were led by eighth-year head coach Chris Hatcher and played their home games at Seibert Stadium in Homewood, Alabama.

Previous season

The Bulldogs finished the 2021 season with a record of 4–7, 3–5 SoCon play to finish in a tied for seventh place.

Schedule

Game summaries

No. 8 Kennesaw State

at No. 2 (FBS) Georgia

at Tennessee Tech

Western Carolina

at Furman

Wofford

at East Tennessee State

at The Citadel

VMI

at No. 11 Chattanooga

No. 19 Mercer

FCS Playoffs

No. 17 Southeastern Louisiana – Second Round

at No. 4 North Dakota State – Quarterfinals

References

Samford
Samford Bulldogs football seasons
Southern Conference football champion seasons
Samford
Samford Bulldogs football